Philtzgérald Grégory Kévin Mbaka (born 24 January 1993), known as Philtzgérald Mbaka, is a professional footballer who plays as a midfielder for Swiss club FC Dardania Lausanne. Born in France, is a former Republic of the Congo international.

Club career

Australia
Mbaka signed a one-year contract with South Melbourne at the beginning of 2016. He first featured in a 4–1 win against Oakleigh Cannons that April. before departing by June.

Oman
Mbaka joined Oman Club in November 2016,, taking the number 31 and becoming teammates with a Brazilian, a Chilean, and a Central Asian. Supplying assists instead of scoring, he helped Al-Ahmar qualify for the semi-finals of the 2016–17 Sultan Qaboos Cup, beating Suwaiq Club 1–0 before being knocked out in the second leg. causing them to not reach the final.

International career
Mbaka played two matches for the Congo national team, including a 1–1 draw with Kenya in Africa Cup of Nations qualifying and a friendly against Ghana.

Honours 
Paris Saint-Germain U19

 Championnat National U19: 2010–11

References

External links
 
 
 SportsTG Profile

1993 births
Living people
People from Villepinte, Seine-Saint-Denis
Republic of the Congo footballers
French footballers
Republic of the Congo international footballers
Association football midfielders
Paris Saint-Germain F.C. players
Segunda División B players
Racing de Santander players
Getafe CF footballers
South Melbourne FC players
Oman Professional League players
Oman Club players
Liga II players
FCV Farul Constanța players
Yverdon-Sport FC players
French sportspeople of Republic of the Congo descent
Republic of the Congo expatriate footballers
French expatriate footballers
Republic of the Congo expatriate sportspeople in Spain
French expatriate sportspeople in Spain
Expatriate footballers in Spain
Republic of the Congo expatriate sportspeople in Australia
French expatriate sportspeople in Australia
Expatriate soccer players in Australia
Republic of the Congo expatriate sportspeople in Oman
French expatriate sportspeople in Oman
Expatriate footballers in Oman
Republic of the Congo expatriate sportspeople in Romania
French expatriate sportspeople in Romania
Expatriate footballers in Romania
Republic of the Congo expatriate sportspeople in Switzerland
French expatriate sportspeople in Switzerland
Expatriate footballers in Switzerland
Footballers from Seine-Saint-Denis
Black French sportspeople